The Balashov single-member constituency (No. 165) is a Russian legislative constituency in the Saratov Oblast.

Nikolai Bondarenko, a famous youtuber and Communist member of the Saratov Oblast Duma, announced that he is running for the State Duma from the Balashov constituency in the 2021 Election.

Members elected

Election results

1993

|-
! colspan=2 style="background-color:#E9E9E9;text-align:left;vertical-align:top;" |Candidate
! style="background-color:#E9E9E9;text-align:left;vertical-align:top;" |Party
! style="background-color:#E9E9E9;text-align:right;" |Votes
! style="background-color:#E9E9E9;text-align:right;" |%
|-
|style="background-color: "|
|align=left|Andrey Dorovskikh
|align=left|Liberal Democratic Party
|87,621
|28.27%
|-
|style="background-color:"|
|align=left|Konstantin Kondratyev
|align=left|Yavlinsky—Boldyrev—Lukin
| -
|27.00%
|-
| colspan="5" style="background-color:#E9E9E9;"|
|- style="font-weight:bold"
| colspan="3" style="text-align:left;" | Total
| 309,977
| 100%
|-
| colspan="5" style="background-color:#E9E9E9;"|
|- style="font-weight:bold"
| colspan="4" |Source:
|
|}

1995

|-
! colspan=2 style="background-color:#E9E9E9;text-align:left;vertical-align:top;" |Candidate
! style="background-color:#E9E9E9;text-align:left;vertical-align:top;" |Party
! style="background-color:#E9E9E9;text-align:right;" |Votes
! style="background-color:#E9E9E9;text-align:right;" |%
|-
|style="background-color: "|
|align=left|Zoya Oykina
|align=left|Communist Party
|112,381
|33.21%
|-
|style="background-color:#00A44E"|
|align=left|Valery Davydov
|align=left|Bloc '89
|55,505
|16.40%
|-
|style="background-color: "|
|align=left|Andrey Dorovskikh (incumbent)
|align=left|Liberal Democratic Party
|34,583
|10.22%
|-
|style="background-color:"|
|align=left|Nikolay Sukhoy
|align=left|Agrarian Party of Russia
|31,396
|9.28%
|-
|style="background-color:"|
|align=left|Valery Kurnaev
|align=left|Our Home – Russia
|27,391
|8.09%
|-
|style="background-color:#D50000"|
|align=left|Viktor Ukhanyov
|align=left|Communists and Working Russia - for the Soviet Union
|17,912
|5.29%
|-
|style="background-color: " |
|align=left|Renat Bayguzin
|align=left|Independent
|7,761
|2.29%
|-
|style="background-color:#265BAB"|
|align=left|Sergey Mukhtarov
|align=left|Russian Lawyers' Association
|6,584
|1.94%
|-
|style="background-color:#1C1A0D"|
|align=left|Vitaly Yegorov
|align=left|Forward, Russia!
|6,262
|1.85%
|-
|style="background-color:#FFF22E"|
|align=left|Vladimir Laptev
|align=left|Beer Lovers Party
|3,580
|1.06%
|-
|style="background-color:#DD137B"|
|align=left|Aleksandr Timoshok
|align=left|Social Democrats
|2,781
|0.82%
|-
|style="background-color:#000000"|
|colspan=2 |against all
|27,231
|8.05%
|-
| colspan="5" style="background-color:#E9E9E9;"|
|- style="font-weight:bold"
| colspan="3" style="text-align:left;" | Total
| 338,375
| 100%
|-
| colspan="5" style="background-color:#E9E9E9;"|
|- style="font-weight:bold"
| colspan="4" |Source:
|
|}

1999

|-
! colspan=2 style="background-color:#E9E9E9;text-align:left;vertical-align:top;" |Candidate
! style="background-color:#E9E9E9;text-align:left;vertical-align:top;" |Party
! style="background-color:#E9E9E9;text-align:right;" |Votes
! style="background-color:#E9E9E9;text-align:right;" |%
|-
|style="background-color:"|
|align=left|Oleg Korgunov
|align=left|Our Home – Russia
|147,998
|42.93%
|-
|style="background-color: "|
|align=left|Vyacheslav Mikhaylov
|align=left|Communist Party
|108,574
|31.49%
|-
|style="background-color:#FF4400"|
|align=left|Aleksey Bezrukikh
|align=left|Andrei Nikolayev and Svyatoslav Fyodorov Bloc
|24,476
|7.10%
|-
|style="background-color:#020266"|
|align=left|Zoya Oykina (incumbent)
|align=left|Russian Socialist Party
|12,611
|3.66%
|-
|style="background-color: " |
|align=left|Nikolay Lukin
|align=left|Independent
|11,050
|3.21%
|-
|style="background-color:#000000"|
|colspan=2 |against all
|33,057
|9.59%
|-
| colspan="5" style="background-color:#E9E9E9;"|
|- style="font-weight:bold"
| colspan="3" style="text-align:left;" | Total
| 344,747
| 100%
|-
| colspan="5" style="background-color:#E9E9E9;"|
|- style="font-weight:bold"
| colspan="4" |Source:
|
|}

2003

|-
! colspan=2 style="background-color:#E9E9E9;text-align:left;vertical-align:top;" |Candidate
! style="background-color:#E9E9E9;text-align:left;vertical-align:top;" |Party
! style="background-color:#E9E9E9;text-align:right;" |Votes
! style="background-color:#E9E9E9;text-align:right;" |%
|-
|style="background-color: " |
|align=left|Pyotr Kamshilov
|align=left|United Russia
|126,339
|42.22%
|-
|style="background-color: "|
|align=left|Viktor Volkov
|align=left|Communist Party
|55,338
|18.49%
|-
|style="background-color:#FFD700"|
|align=left|Oleg Korgunov (incumbent)
|align=left|People's Party of the Russian Federation
|43,056
|14.39%
|-
|style="background-color:#1042A5"|
|align=left|Aleksandr Vetrov
|align=left|Union of Right Forces
|24,118
|8.06%
|-
|style="background-color: " |
|align=left|Vladimir Skachek
|align=left|Liberal Democratic Party
|7,249
|2.42%
|-
|style="background-color:#164C8C"|
|align=left|Nadezhda Nesterova
|align=left|United Russian Party Rus'
|3,738
|1.25%
|-
|style="background-color: " |
|align=left|Sergey Bolganov
|align=left|Independent
|2,439
|0.82%
|-
|style="background-color:#00A1FF"|
|align=left|Spartak Stepanov
|align=left|Party of Russia's Rebirth-Russian Party of Life
|2,190
|0.73%
|-
|style="background-color: " |
|align=left|Valery Seryapin
|align=left|Independent
|1,286
|0.43%
|-
|style="background-color:#000000"|
|colspan=2 |against all
|28,565
|9.55%
|-
| colspan="5" style="background-color:#E9E9E9;"|
|- style="font-weight:bold"
| colspan="3" style="text-align:left;" | Total
| 299,254
| 100%
|-
| colspan="5" style="background-color:#E9E9E9;"|
|- style="font-weight:bold"
| colspan="4" |Source:
|
|}

2016

|-
! colspan=2 style="background-color:#E9E9E9;text-align:left;vertical-align:top;" |Candidate
! style="background-color:#E9E9E9;text-align:left;vertical-align:top;" |Party
! style="background-color:#E9E9E9;text-align:right;" |Votes
! style="background-color:#E9E9E9;text-align:right;" |%
|-
|style="background-color: " |
|align=left|Mikhail Isayev
|align=left|United Russia
|163,931
|54.5%
|-
|style="background-color: " |
|align=left|Olga Alimova
|align=left|Communist Party
|42,839
|14.3%
|-
|style="background-color: " |
|align=left|Svetlana Martynova
|align=left|Liberal Democratic Party
|31,727
|10.6%
|-
|style="background-color: " |
|align=left|Galina Platoshina
|align=left|A Just Russia
|27,791
|9.2%
|-
|style="background: #E62020;"| 
|align=left|Yuri Gavrilichev
|align=left|Communists of Russia
|12,448
|4.1%
|-
|style="background-color: " |
|align=left|Vyacheslav Shcherbakov
|align=left|Rodina
|7,383
|2.5%
|-
|style="background-color: " |
|align=left|Ilya Kozlyakov
|align=left|Yabloko
|5,500
|1.8%
|-
|style="background: #21421E;"| 
|align=left|Anna Kupets
|align=left|Greens
|4,826
|1.6%
|-
|style="background-color: " |
|align=left|Dmitry Ignatyev
|align=left|People's Freedom Party
|4,149
|1.4%
|-
| colspan="5" style="background-color:#E9E9E9;"|
|- style="font-weight:bold"
| colspan="4" |Source:
|
|}

2018

|-
! colspan=2 style="background-color:#E9E9E9;text-align:left;vertical-align:top;" |Candidate
! style="background-color:#E9E9E9;text-align:left;vertical-align:top;" |Party
! style="background-color:#E9E9E9;text-align:right;" |Votes
! style="background-color:#E9E9E9;text-align:right;" |%
|-
|style="background-color: " |
|align=left|Yevgeny Primakov
|align=left|United Russia
|104,227
|65.15%
|-
|style="background-color: " |
|align=left|Yelena Shanina
|align=left|Communists of Russia
|18,481
|11.55%
|-
|style="background-color: " |
|align=left|Stanislav Denisenko
|align=left|Liberal Democratic Party
|11,575
|7.24%
|-
|style="background-color: " |
|align=left|Nadezhda Skvortsova
|align=left|A Just Russia
|9,722
|6.08%
|-
|style="background-color: " |
|align=left|Yelena Chervyakova
|align=left|Party of Pensioners
|6,505
|4.07%
|-
|style="background-color: " |
|align=left|Ilya Kozlyakov
|align=left|Yabloko
|2,312
|1.45%
|-
|style="background-color: " |
|align=left|Sergey Slepchenko
|align=left|Independent
|1,590
|0.99%
|-
| colspan="5" style="background-color:#E9E9E9;"|
|- style="font-weight:bold"
| colspan="3" style="text-align:left;" | Total
| 159,985
| 100%
|-
| colspan="5" style="background-color:#E9E9E9;"|
|- style="font-weight:bold"
| colspan="4" |Source:
|
|}

2021

|-
! colspan=2 style="background-color:#E9E9E9;text-align:left;vertical-align:top;" |Candidate
! style="background-color:#E9E9E9;text-align:left;vertical-align:top;" |Party
! style="background-color:#E9E9E9;text-align:right;" |Votes
! style="background-color:#E9E9E9;text-align:right;" |%
|-
|style="background-color: " |
|align=left|Andrey Vorobiev
|align=left|United Russia
|121,326
|52.50%
|-
|style="background-color: " |
|align=left|Nikolay Bondarenko
|align=left|Communist Party
|67,352
|29.14%
|-
|style="background-color: " |
|align=left|Dmitry Arkhipov
|align=left|Communists of Russia
|7,861
|3.40%
|-
|style="background-color: " |
|align=left|Oleg Meshcheryakov
|align=left|Liberal Democratic Party
|6,851
|2.96%
|-
|style="background-color: " |
|align=left|Sergey Gromyko
|align=left|Party of Pensioners
|6,382
|2.76%
|-
|style="background-color: " |
|align=left|Aleksandr Fedorchenko
|align=left|A Just Russia — For Truth
|6,364
|2.75%
|-
|style="background-color: "|
|align=left|Vladimir Morozov
|align=left|New People
|4,409
|1.91%
|-
|style="background-color: "|
|align=left|Sergey Demin
|align=left|Rodina
|2,604
|1.13%
|-
|style="background-color: " |
|align=left|Ilya Kozlyakov
|align=left|Yabloko
|1,404
|0.61%
|-
| colspan="5" style="background-color:#E9E9E9;"|
|- style="font-weight:bold"
| colspan="3" style="text-align:left;" | Total
| 231,098
| 100%
|-
| colspan="5" style="background-color:#E9E9E9;"|
|- style="font-weight:bold"
| colspan="4" |Source:
|
|}

Sources
166. Балашовский одномандатный избирательный округ

References

Russian legislative constituencies
Politics of Saratov Oblast